Log management (LM) comprises an approach to dealing with large volumes of computer-generated log messages (also known as audit records, audit trails, event-logs, etc.).

Log management generally covers:

 Log collection
 Centralized log aggregation
 Long-term log storage and retention
 Log rotation
 Log analysis (in real-time and in bulk after storage)
 Log search and reporting.

Overview 

The primary drivers for log management implementations are concerns about security, system and network operations (such as system or network administration) and regulatory compliance. Logs are generated by nearly every computing device, and can often be directed to different locations both on a local file system or remote system. 

Effectively analyzing large volumes of diverse logs can pose many challenges, such as:

 Volume: log data can reach hundreds of gigabytes of data per day for a large organization. Simply collecting, centralizing and storing data at this volume can be challenging.
 Normalization: logs are produced in multiple formats. The process of normalization is designed to provide a common output for analysis from diverse sources.
 Velocity: The speed at which logs are produced from devices can make collection and aggregation difficult
 Veracity: Log events may not be accurate. This is especially problematic for systems that perform detection, such as intrusion detection systems.

Users and potential users of log management may purchase complete commercial tools or build their own log-management and intelligence tools, assembling the functionality from various open-source components, or acquire (sub-)systems from commercial vendors. Log management is a complicated process and organizations often make mistakes while approaching it.

Logging can produce technical information usable for the maintenance of applications or websites. It can serve:

 to define whether a reported bug is actually a bug
 to help analyze, reproduce and solve bugs
 to help test new features in a development stage

Terminology 

Suggestions were made to change the definition of logging. This change would keep matters both purer and more easily maintainable:
 
 Logging would then be defined as all instantly discardable data on the technical process of an application or website, as it represents and processes data and user input. 
 Auditing, then, would involve data that is not immediately discardable. In other words: data that is assembled in the auditing process, is stored persistently, is protected by authorization schemes and is, always, connected to some end-user functional requirement.

Deployment life-cycle 

One view of assessing the maturity of an organization in terms of the deployment of log-management tools might use successive levels such as:

 in the initial stages, organizations use different log-analyzers for analyzing the logs in the devices on the security perimeter.  They aim to identify the patterns of attack on the perimeter infrastructure of the organization.
 with the increased use of integrated computing, organizations mandate logs to identify the access and usage of confidential data within the security perimeter.
 at the next level of maturity, the log analyzer can track and monitor the performance and availability of systems at the level of the enterprise — especially of those information assets whose availability organizations regard as vital.
 organizations integrate the logs of various business applications into an enterprise log manager for a better value proposition.
 organizations merge the physical-access monitoring and the logical-access monitoring into a single view.

See also
Audit trail
Common Base Event
Common Log Format
DARPA PRODIGAL and Anomaly Detection at Multiple Scales (ADAMS) projects.
Data logging
Log analysis
Log monitor
Log management knowledge base
Security information and event management
Server log
Syslog
Web counter
Web log analysis software

References 

 Chris MacKinnon: "LMI In The Enterprise". Processor November 18, 2005, Vol.27 Issue 46, page 33. Online at http://www.processor.com/editorial/article.asp?article=articles%2Fp2746%2F09p46%2F09p46.asp, retrieved 2007-09-10
 MITRE: Common Event Expression (CEE) Proposed Log Standard.  Online at http://cee.mitre.org, retrieved 2010-03-03
 NIST 800-92: Guide to Security Log Management. Online at http://csrc.nist.gov/publications/nistpubs/800-92/SP800-92.pdf, retrieved 2010-03-03

External links
 InfoWorld review and comparison of commercial Log Management products

Network management
Computer systems